Rogue Heroes can refer to: 
 Rogue Heroes: Ruins of Tasos
 SAS: Rogue Heroes